Ádám Gergely Kovácsik (pronounced ; born 4 April 1991) is a Hungarian footballer who plays for Győr on loan from Fehérvár as a goalkeeper.

Club career
Kovácsik began his career as a youth player by Budapest Honvéd FC. He played first as a field player, however, yet at the age of seven stood between the sticks. In 2002, he moved to city rivals Ferencvárosi TC. In his second year by Ferencváros, Kovácsik won the Christmas Cup ahead of the youth sides of A.C. Milan and FC Barcelona. In 2006, he was member of the team that won the European final of the Nike Premier Cup, one of the most prestigious tournaments in the younger age categories. For his performances in that year, he was handed the Tibor Simon Award (Simon Tibor-díj), a prize named after former loyal Ferencváros defender Tibor Simon, which is given to individual who showed the most spirited display throughout the season.

In the following year Kovácsik signed to Reggina Calcio. Although he made his senior debut for the Southern Italian side on 30 May 2010 against U.C. AlbinoLeffe as a late substitute, Kovácsik remained only a reserve player until the departure of first choice keeper Christian Puggioni in the summer of 2011. Starting from the 2011–12 season Kovácsik got more playing minutes and produced some excellent performances, including saving two penalties in a 3–0 win over Brescia in October 2011.

In the 2012 winter transfer window, Reggina loaned him to Italian third-division-side Foligno.

In the next season, he was loaned to third-division-side team Pavia.

On 13 July 2013, it was officially announced that Kovácsik would play the season with Serie B side Carpi. He made his debut in Coppa Italia against his mother-club Reggina, at a 1-0 away loss. He played his first match in his new club, in the Serie B, against Ternana.

In the summer 2014, Kovacsik was back to Reggina on Lega Pro.

On 15 July 2022, Kovácsik was loaned to Győr.

International career
Kovácsik represented Hungary since his earliest time as a player. His best result on the international stage came at the 2009 FIFA U-20 World Cup, where he earned the bronze medal.

Club statistics

Updated to games played as of 15 May 2022.

Honours
Videoton
 Nemzeti Bajnokság I: 2017-18
 Hungarian Cup: 2018-19

 FIFA U-20 World Cup:
Third place: 2009

Awards
 Tibor Simon Award (2006)

References

External links

Reggina Calcio Official Website Profile

1991 births
Footballers from Budapest
Living people
Hungarian footballers
Hungary youth international footballers
Hungary international footballers
Association football goalkeepers
Serie B players
Serie C players
Nemzeti Bajnokság I players
Nemzeti Bajnokság II players
Reggina 1914 players
A.S.D. Città di Foligno 1928 players
F.C. Pavia players
A.C. Carpi players
Fehérvár FC players
Győri ETO FC players
Hungarian expatriate footballers
Expatriate footballers in Italy
Hungarian expatriate sportspeople in Italy